Vaccarizzo Albanese (Arbëresh: Vakarici) is an Italian town and comune (municipality) of the province of Cosenza, Calabria,  southern Italy.

History
The town was founded in 1470 as Vaccarizzo. In 1863 its toponym changed adding Albanese (i.e. "Albanian"), due to its origins.

Geography
Vaccarizzo is bordered by Acri, San Cosmo Albanese and San Giorgio Albanese.

Language

Vaccarizzo Albanian, the Arbëresh dialect of the Albanian language that is spoken in the villages of Vaccarizzo Albanese and San Giorgio Albanese, in southern Italy, by approximately 3,000 people. Vaccarizzo Albanian has retained many archaic features of the Tosk dialect, on which the Standard Albanian is based.

References

External links

Official website 

Arbëresh settlements
Cities and towns in Calabria